George White was a state legislator in Mississippi. He represented Chickasaw County in 1874 and 1875. He represented Chickasaw County, Mississippi in the Mississippi House of Representatives in1874 and 1875.

See also
African-American officeholders during and following the Reconstruction era

References

Members of the Mississippi House of Representatives
19th-century American politicians
Year of birth missing
Year of death missing